Abu Salek is a Jatiya Party (Ershad) politician and the former Member of Parliament of Chittagong-1.

Career
Salek was elected to parliament from Chittagong-1 as a Jatiya Party candidate in 1988.

References

Jatiya Party politicians
Living people
4th Jatiya Sangsad members
Year of birth missing (living people)